La Grande High School is a public high school in the western United States, located in La Grande, Oregon.

Academics
In 2008, 81% of the school's seniors received a high school diploma. Of 197 students, 159 graduated, 29 dropped out, and nine were still in high school in 2009.

Notable students
Jadin Bell, a 15-year-old student and member of the school's cheerleading squad, committed suicide in early 2013 after a period of intense bullying by other students.  There are indications of failure on the part of local authorities to effectively address the bullying.  The story, and that of Bell's legacy, was made into a movie featuring Mark Wahlberg.

References

External links
 La Grande High School

High schools in Union County, Oregon
La Grande, Oregon
Public high schools in Oregon